San Pier Niceto (Sicilian: San Pieru Nicetu) is a comune (municipality) in the Province of Messina in the Italian region Sicily, located about  east of Palermo and about  west of Messina.

The municipality of San Pier Niceto contains the frazioni (subdivisions, mainly villages and hamlets) San Pier Marina, Serro, Zifronte, and Pirrera.

San Pier Niceto borders the following municipalities: Condrò, Fiumedinisi, Gualtieri Sicaminò, Monforte San Giorgio, Pace del Mela, Santa Lucia del Mela.

Demographic evolution

References

External links
 www.comunesanpierniceto.me.it

Cities and towns in Sicily